Stuckey's is a convenience store in the Southeast, Southwest, and Midwestern United States. known for its pecan log rolls and kitschy souvenirs. Additionally, Stuckey's sells candy, apparel, and souvenirs, and other products online. 

Stuckey's Corporation is headquartered in Eastman, Georgia, and in 2021, purchased a pecan processing and candy making plant in Wrens, Georgia. The current CEO of Stuckey's is Stephanie Stuckey, granddaughter of the brand's founder W.S. Stuckey Sr.

History

Early days
Back in the 1930s, with a Model A Ford Coupe he borrowed from his friend and $35 he borrowed from his grandmother, W.S. Stuckey Sr., drove around the Eastman, Georgia, countryside buying pecans from local farmers and selling them to local pecan processors. Stuckey made over $4500 his first year in the pecan business.

By 1937, Stuckey was selling over $150,000 worth of pecans a year that he bought himself and sold to local processors. That same year, he opened a roadside stand along Highway 23 in Eastman selling pecans, sugar cane juice, syrup, homemade quilts, and “all you can drink for five-cents” cherry cider.

Business increased after Stuckey's wife Ethel began making pecan pralines. After she tried out a recipe for pecan log rolls and added her own secret ingredient (maraschino cherries) to the mix, things got so good that the next year Stuckey built his own store in Eastman. The year after that, he opened another store in Unadilla, Georgia. Another soon followed in Hilliard, Florida with each Stuckey’s making their own candy on site.

Stuckey’s franchise expansion was slowed by World War II when Stuckey was forced to close his Unadilla branch. Sometime later, the Hilliard Stuckey’s burned to the ground. However, during the war, Stuckey managed to stay afloat after buying a candy making factory in Jacksonville, Florida and securing government contracts making candy for the troops.

After the war ended, Stuckey's business once again began to grow as it opened a number of new franchises. The company then constructed its own candy factory in Eastman to supply an eventual 350-plus Stuckey's stores located throughout the continental US. As the post-war baby boom flourished and families undertook more long-distance auto travel, Stuckey's continued to grow along major highways, often paired with Texaco gas stations.

Downfall, then rise

After a failed attempt to go into the hospitality business in the early 1960s with Stuckey's Carriage Inns (only four of the motels were actually built), and with over 368 stores across the country now filled with candy, novelty toys, and kitschy souvenirs, the franchise seemed to become something bigger than one man alone could handle. As a result, Stuckey sold his franchise to Pet, Inc., maker of Pet Milk. 

W.S. Stuckey Sr. died in 1977, the same year that Illinois Central Industries, a Chicago conglomerate, bought Pet Milk Co., and they began to close Stuckey’s stores across the country. By the end of the decade, only 75 original Stuckey’s stores remained.

Nevertheless, in 1984, W.S. “Billy” Stuckey, Jr., son of the founder and a five-term Congressman from the 8th District of Georgia, repurchased Stuckey’s and began to turn the company around. Billy had a new idea for the company – Stuckey’s Express, a store-within-a-store concept that resulted in over 165 licensed Stuckey’s Express stores in 17 states. He also sold the Eastman candy making plant to Standard Candy Company in Nashville, Tennessee who shuttered it during the 2009 recession. Still, Stuckey’s world-famous pecan log rolls and other pecan candies would continue to be made by outside vendors.

Stuckey’s “comeback” really began taking off, however, after W.S. Stuckey Sr.’s granddaughter, Ethel “Stephanie” Stuckey, a former Georgia State Representative herself, took her life’s savings, bought the company and became its CEO in November 2019.

Back in family hands once again, in August 2020, Stuckey’s acquired Front Porch Pecans, a pecan snack company that sells to domestic and foreign markets, including grocery channels in the Southeast U.S.  With this merger, Stuckey’s gained management support with R.G. Lamar as new President to run Stuckey’s with Stephanie, as well as a new product line to market to more health-conscious consumers.

In January 2021, Stephanie and R.G. acquired Atwell Pecans, The Orchards Gourmet, and Thames corporations to add candy making, pecan processing, and fundraising businesses to the company’s portfolio.

Today, Stuckey’s has 65 licensed locations, a distribution center based in Eastman, a pecan and candy plant to make their own Stuckey’s products, an active online business, and some 200 retailers that sell Stuckey’s pecan snacks and candies. With fresh leadership, new acquisitions, and increased market share for Georgia’s homegrown nut, the pecan, Stuckey’s is on the rebound.

Stuckey hopes to eventually own a handful of Stuckey’s interstate stores to revive the original premise behind the company as a “roadside oasis” while continuing to build up the candy making side of the business to secure its future for another 85 years.

See also
Nickerson Farms 
Horne's (restaurant)

References

External links

See also
Nickerson Farms
Horne's (restaurant)

Companies based in Dodge County, Georgia
American companies established in 1937
Retail companies established in 1937
Convenience stores of the United States
Economy of the Southeastern United States
Franchises
1937 establishments in Georgia (U.S. state)